Andrew P. Hansen is a retired United States Air Force brigadier general who last served as the Deputy Chief of Staff for Operations of the Allied Air Command. Prior to that, he was the Director of United States Air Forces in Europe-United Kingdom.

References

External links

Year of birth missing (living people)
Living people
Place of birth missing (living people)
United States Air Force generals